Naucratis or Naukratis (Ancient Greek: , "Naval Command"; Egyptian: , , ,) was a city and trading-post in ancient Egypt, located on the Canopic (western-most) branch of the Nile river, south-east of the Mediterranean sea and the city of Alexandria. Naucratis was the first and, for much of its early history, the only permanent Greek colony in Egypt, serving as a symbiotic nexus for the interchange of Greek and Egyptian art and culture.

The modern villages of Kom Gi’eif, el-Nibeira and el-Niqrash cover the archaeological site, which has become a find of the highest significance. The site is also the source of many art objects which can now be seen in many of the world’s museums and is an important source of some of the earliest Greek writing in existence, according to inscriptions on the pottery.

The sister port of Naucratis was the harbour town of Heracleion, which was discovered in 2000.

Background
Archaeological evidence suggests that the history of the ancient Greeks in Egypt dates back at least to Mycenaean times (1600–1100 BC) and more likely even further back into the proto-Greek Minoan age. This history is strictly one of commerce as no permanent Greek settlements have been found of these cultures to date.

After the collapse of Mycenaean Greek civilization and the ensuing Greek dark ages (c. 1100–750 BC), a "renaissance" of Greek culture flourished in the 7th century BC—with it came renewed contact with the East and its two great river civilizations of Mesopotamia and the Nile.

The first report of Greeks in 7th century BC Egypt is a story in the Histories of Herodotus of Ionian and Carian pirates forced by storm to land on or near the Nile Delta. It relates the plight of the Saite Pharaoh Psammetichus I (Psamtik) (c. 664–610) of the Twenty-sixth dynasty of Egypt overthrown and in desperation seeking the advice of the Oracle of Leto at Buto, who cryptically advises him to enlist the aid of the "bronze men" who would "come from the sea." Inspired upon seeing the bronze armor of the shipwrecked pirates, he offers them rewards in return for their aid in his campaign of return to power. Upon the success of this endeavor, he makes good on his word and bestows on the mercenaries two parcels of land (or "camps," ) on either side of the Pelusian branch of the Nile.

At present these sites remain uncertain but this may be a reference to the city of Daphnae.

History
Naukratis was the site of an Egyptian town before the Greeks arrived, later becoming established as a military settlement occupied by mercenaries. Naukratis was located on the Canopic branch of the Nile in the western Delta some 16 km from Sais. The Canopic tributary was one of the major waterways linking the Nile valley with the Mediterranean, and the most accessible of the Nile’s tributaries during the Saite Period. The early settlement then developed into a busy trading port. They exchanged goods with the Greeks and with other Mediterranean states. Greeks traders settled in Naukratis and a large Greek community began to develop.

Ancient sources
In 570 BC, the Pharaoh Apries (Wahibre, reigned  589–570 BC) led the descendants of his mercenary army made up of 30,000 Carians and Ionians against a former general turned rebel by the name of Amasis. Although fighting valiantly, the mercenaries suffered defeat and Amasis II became Pharaoh (reigning 570–526 BC). Amasis shut down the "camps" and moved the Greek soldiers to Memphis where they were employed "to guard him against the native Egyptians."

Herodotus stated that "Amasis was partial to the Greeks, and among other favors which he granted them, gave to such as liked to settle in Egypt the city of Naucratis for their residence." Notice that he says "gave the city," which seems to indicate the existence (now borne out by archaeological evidence) of a "city" already there. This older city, settlement more likely, was no doubt small and inhabited by a mix of native Egyptians, Greeks and possibly even Phoenicians. Thus it seems the city was turned over to the Greeks, "chartered," in the years immediately following 570 BC. The earlier date of c. 625 BC put forward by archaeologists may be the actual establishment of a settlement at the site.

Amasis indeed converted Naucratis into a major treaty-port and commercial link with the west. This was done most likely as a means to contain the Greeks and concentrate their activities in one place under his control. It became not the colony of any particular city-state but an emporion (trading post) similar to Al Mina, the largest market port of north Syria.

According to Herodotus the walled shrine known as the Hellenion was a co-operative enterprise financed by nine eastern Greek cities:
Four Ionian: Chios, Klazomenai, Teos and Phocaea
Four Dorian: Rhodes, Halicarnassus, Knidos and Phaselis
One Aeolian: Mytilene
Miletus, Samos and Aegina had their own separate sanctuaries. Thus the natives of at least twelve Greek city-states worked in a collaboration that was not only rare but proved to be lasting.

Naucratis later became an important center of Greek culture under the Roman Empire, producing several celebrated orators of the Second Sophistic in the second and early third centuries AD. The third century writer Athenaeus came from Naucratis.

Archaeology

The site was discovered by Flinders Petrie who dug there in 1884–1885. He was followed by Ernest Arthur Gardner and finally David George Hogarth, in 1899 and 1903. Hogarth was assisted in the 1903 dig by Campbell Cowan Edgar.

The archaeological focus fell into two areas of northern and southern quarters. Found farthest south was a large Egyptian storehouse or treasury (A on sketch at right—originally identified by Petrie as the "great temenos") and just north of that a Greek mud-brick Temple of Aphrodite roughly 14 m × 8 m (curiously not mentioned in Herodotus' list.) Directly east of this temple was unearthed a small factory for faience scarab seals.

In the northern section were found several temple ruins (E: Temple of Hera, F: Temple of Apollo & G: Temple of Dioscuri) including what may be Herodotus' Hellenion discovered by Hogarth in 1899 (directly east of F). "None of the votive pottery found here need have arrived earlier than the reign of Amasis, so it may well be that the Hellenion was founded as the result of his reorganization of the status of Naucratis, while the independent sanctuaries ... are of the earlier years of the town."

More recently American archaeologists W. Coulson and A. Leonard founded "The Naucratis Project" in 1977 carrying out surveys in 1977–1978 and further surveys and excavations to the south of the site from 1980–1982 (under the auspices of the American Research Center in Egypt). Unfortunately they found the original northern sanctuary section submerged under a lake formed by the risen water table and roughly 15 m deep. This part of the site remains under water today, making further work there difficult if not impossible. Their assessment of the approach taken and methods used by their predecessors was less than complimentary. "Unfortunately, much of the emphasis of the early excavators was placed on these religious structures at the expense of the commercial and domestic quarters. Consequently our knowledge of the mercantile character of ancient Naukratis—the very facet of its early history that made it so exceptional—has suffered greatly. Furthermore, the later historical sequences, such as the Hellenistic and Roman periods, were almost totally neglected." Also discouraging to them was the destruction wrought by the local populace on the site. "Already in Petrie's day about a third of the half-mile by quarter-mile site of Naukratis had been dug away by the local farmers for use as high-phosphate fertilizer (sebakh) in their fields.... In the intervening 100 years or so, the sebakhin have totally destroyed this eastern portion of the site." The barrier of the high water table made it impossible for them to find anything older than the Ptolmaic era. They agreed with Hogarth that the "great temenos" of Petrie was actually an Egyptian building and that indeed the entire south section of the town appeared to be non-Greek. Overall most of the finds were vases (some whole, most fragmentary) used as votives in the temples, but also stone statuettes and scarab seals. These are scattered to museums and collections around the world, the earlier material largely brought to Britain (mostly in the British Museum) and the latter to the Graeco-Roman Museum in Alexandria.

Impact
The Egyptians supplied the Greeks with mostly grain but also linen and papyrus while the Greeks bartered mostly silver but also timber, olive oil and wine. Naukratis, and the associated Greek "forts" in the general delta area, as demonstrated by accounts given above, became a ready source of mercenary fighting men for the Saite pharaohs, men with superior hoplite armor and tactics, also possessing invaluable naval expertise.

Naucratis soon became a profound source of inspiration to the Greeks by re-exposing them to the wonders of Egyptian architecture and sculpture lost to them since the Bronze Age. Egyptian artifacts soon began their flow along the Greek trade routes finding their way into the homes and workshops of the Ionian Greek world and, via Aegina, the city-states of mainland Greece. Although Greek art and ideas in turn came back the other way their absorption into a largely xenophobic Egyptian culture was strictly minimal.

Although Herodotus claimed that geometry was first known in Egypt and then passed into Greece, it is now generally accepted by scholars that what the Greeks learned were more like "surveying techniques" and hardly deserve the designation "geometry" in the sense of a purely intellectual mathematical practice. Indeed, Greeks like Thales were already accomplished geometricians before their travel to Egypt and very likely Herodotus assumed that because the Egyptian  was older, the Greeks must have got it from there.

In terms of our modern understanding of the Greeks, and in particular the early use of their nascent Greek alphabet, the finds of Naucratis have turned out to be foundational. "The inscriptions on the pottery have yielded what Mr. Ernest Gardner considers—apparently on firm grounds—to be the oldest Ionic inscriptions, as well as some in the Korinthian, Melian, and Lesbian alphabets." Of particular interest are the several examples of an evolutionary variation from the original Phoenician alphabetic script. Much has also been learned by comparing these alphabets with the forms they assumed a century later, forms that were destined to become universal across the Hellenic world.

Naucratis was not only the first Greek settlement in Egypt but also Egypt's most important harbor in antiquity until the rise of Alexandria and the shifting of the Nile led to its decline. Nevertheless, the ancient city of Heracleion/Thonis also rivalled Naucratis as an important port city of Egypt, especially from the 6th to the 4th century BC.

Herodotus
Herodotus wrote that the prostitutes of Naucratis were "peculiarly alluring" and relates the story of Charaxus, brother of the poet Sappho, who traveled to Naucratis to purchase (for a "vast sum") the freedom of one Rhodopis, a bewitchingly beautiful Thracian slave and courtesan. After obtaining her freedom, she set up a brothel, built up a thriving business and amassed a small fortune. As a measure of thanks, she commissioned an expensive votive offering to the gods, eventually placed at Delphi, which could be seen in the historian's day.

Athenaeus
Athenaeus, in the Deipnosophistae, writes that in Naucratis the people dine in the Prytaneion on the natal day of the Hestia Prytanitis.

In popular culture
In the 1989 film Indiana Jones and the Last Crusade, Harrison Ford's character, archaeologist Indiana Jones, briefly mentions Naucratis during a university lecture.

See also
List of ancient Egyptian towns and cities
Decree of Nectanebo I, originally known as the 'Stele of Naukratis'. Issued by Nectanebo I.
Proclus of Naucratis
Cleomenes of Naucratis

Notes and references

Notes

Explanatory footnotes

Citations

Sources

Further reading 

M.M. Austin—Greece and Egypt in the Archaic Age. Cambridge Philological Society, 1970.
F. W. von Bissing, Naukratis, Bulletin de la Société Royale d’Archéologie d’Alexandrie 39 (1951) 32–82
W.D.E. Coulson, Ancient Naukratis Vol. 2, The Survey at Naukratis and Environs, pt.1. Oxford: Oxbow. 1996.
Astrid Möller, Naukratis: Trade in Archaic Greece (Oxford Monographs on Classical Archaeology). Oxford: Oxford University Press, 2000. xvii + 290 pp., . (Book Review)
A. Leonard Jr., W.D.E. Coulson, The Naukratis Project, 1983, NARCE 125, 1984, 28–40.
M. S. Venit—Greek Painted Pottery from Naukratis in Egyptian Museums. American Research Center in Egypt, 1988 xiv + 210 pages + 85 plates, .

External links 

Naukratis: a city and trading port in Egypt, British Museum
Kom Gi'eif archaeological information:
W. M. Flinders Petrie: Naukratis, London 1886. Digital edition

Archaeological sites in Egypt
Milesian colonies
Ancient Greek archaeological sites in Egypt
Former populated places in Egypt
Nile Delta
Ancient Greeks in Egypt